Márk Mészáros (born 26 February 1988) is a Hungarian football player who plays for Jamina SE.

References

1988 births
Living people
Sportspeople from Miskolc
Hungarian footballers
Hungary youth international footballers
Association football defenders
Újpest FC players
Lombard-Pápa TFC footballers
Rákospalotai EAC footballers
Kazincbarcikai SC footballers
Nyíregyháza Spartacus FC players
Soproni VSE players
Nyírbátori FC players
Szeged-Csanád Grosics Akadémia footballers
Békéscsaba 1912 Előre footballers
Nemzeti Bajnokság I players
Nemzeti Bajnokság II players